Twenties is an American single-camera comedy series created by Lena Waithe. The plot is semi-autobiographical and follows "a queer black girl, Hattie, and her two straight best friends, Marie and Nia, who spend most of their days talking 'ish' and chasing their dreams." The show stars Jonica T. Gibbs, Christina Elmore, Gabrielle Graham, Sophina Brown, and Big Sean. It premiered on BET on March 4, 2020. In June 2020, the series was renewed for a second season, which premiered on October 13, 2021.

Plot 
The scripted comedy series follows a queer black woman in her twenties, Hattie (Jonica T. Gibbs), and her two straight best friends, Marie (Christina Elmore) and Nia (Gabrielle Graham), as they try to find their footing in life, love, and the professional world in Los Angeles.

Cast 
 Jonica T. Gibbs as Hattie, a lesbian aspiring screenwriter
 Christina Elmore as Marie, a television studio executive
 Gabrielle Graham as Nia, a yoga teacher
 Sophina Brown as Ida B, Hattie's boss
 Big Sean as Tristan, Nia's love interest

Recurring 
 Kym Whitley as Esther, Hattie's mom
 Madeleine Byrne as Lauren
 Shylo Shaner as Idina
 Ashli Haynes as Courtney
 Parker Young as Zach

Guest stars 
 Jevon McFerrin as Chuck
 Rick Fox as Richard, Chuck's father
 Iman Shumpert as Quintrell
 Vanessa Williams as Angela, Chuck's mother
 Nazanin Mandi as Soraya

Episodes

Series overview

Season 1 (2020)

Season 2 (2021)

Twenties After-Show With B. Scott

Production

Development 
Lena Waithe wrote the series when she was in her twenties based on her experience of Los Angeles when she first moved there. She stated that she was intentional about creating a series starring a "masculine-presenting stud" with straight friends because that was her own personal experience. Waithe asked Susan Fales-Hill to help her produce the series, which was initially in talks to be produced by BET, then landed at Hulu before being picked up by BET again. It is the first series on the network to center a queer lead character.

On April 15, 2019, BET announced that they had ordered the eight-episode comedy series, Twenties, written by Lena Waithe. Waithe is the co-showrunner with Fales-Hill. The two are also executive producers with Rishi Rajani and Andrew Coles. The director of the pilot, and co-executive producer is Justin Tipping.

Of her experience filming Twenties, Waithe stated that BET gave no notes and was supportive of the producers' creative vision.

On June 26, 2020, BET renewed the series for a second season. A talk show hosted by B. Scott, Twenties After-Show With B. Scott, premiered on October 13, 2021.

Release 
The series premiered on March 4, 2020. The second season premiered on October 13, 2021.

Critical reception 
Twenties has received "generally favorable reviews" according to aggregator Metacritic, where it received a score of 73/100. It received a 93% rating on Rotten Tomatoes and is described in the critics consensus, "sharply written and hilarious relatable, Twenties is another impressive series from creator Lena Waithe that also announces Jonica T. Gibbs as a talent to watch."

In a review for Variety, Caroline Framke wrote, "In large part thanks to Gibbs' appealingly loose performance, it's entertaining to watch Hattie figure out how to break into the business, but without any clear motivations pushing her, it's frustratingly ephemeral. If she and Twenties want to be memorable, they both have to figure out what's actually driving them to do it." In a less positive review, Kellee Terrell of The A.V. Club stated: "Pilots are always tricky because they have to introduce viewers to new characters and rules, but the hyperfocus on Blackness distracts from the real issue at hand: [] character development."

Accolades

References

External links 
 
 
 
 

2020 American television series debuts
2020s American black sitcoms
2020s American LGBT-related comedy television series
BET original programming
English-language television shows
Lesbian-related television shows
Television shows directed by Justin Tipping